Charles Williams (1807 – 17 October 1877) was Principal of Jesus College, Oxford, from 1857 to 1877.

Life
Williams studied at Jesus College from 1823 to 1827, holding a scholarship and gaining a First in Literae Humaniores. He was then ordained, and was a missionary Fellow of the college from 1829 to 1845. He was headmaster of Ruthin School for a time, before becoming the incumbent of the church at Holyhead in 1845.  He was made an honorary canon of Bangor Cathedral in 1856 before being appointed as Principal of Jesus College, Oxford in 1857. He died in the Principal's Lodgings in the college in 1877, aged 70.

References

1877 deaths
Fellows of Jesus College, Oxford
Alumni of Jesus College, Oxford
Principals of Jesus College, Oxford
1804 births
Year of birth uncertain